Louis Nerz (1866 in Mimoň – 1938 in Vienna) was an Austrian screenwriter and actor. He is also credited as Ludwig Nerz.

Selected filmography
Screenwriter
 The Grinning Face (1921)
 The Venus (1922)
 The Marquise of Clermont (1922)
 Meriota the Dancer (1922)
 The Hell of Barballo (1923)
 The Hands of Orlac (1924)
 Pension Groonen (1925)
 Der Rosenkavalier (1926)
 Eros in Chains (1929)

Bibliography
 Jung, Uli & Schatzberg, Walter. Beyond Caligari: The Films of Robert Wiene. Berghahn Books, 1999.

References

External links

1866 births
1938 deaths
Austrian male screenwriters
Austrian male film actors
20th-century Austrian male actors
20th-century Austrian screenwriters
20th-century Austrian male writers
People from Mimoň
Austrian people of German Bohemian descent